William Donald Watson (22 December 1869 – 25 March 1953) was a New Zealand rugby union player. A forward, Watson represented Wairarapa at a provincial level, and was a member of the New Zealand national side in 1893 and 1896. He played three matches for New Zealand, including matches against New South Wales and Queensland, but did not appear in any Test matches as New Zealand did not play its first full international until 1903.

Later in his life, Watson was a judge at sheepdog trials. He died at Masterton on 25 March 1953, and was buried at the Archer Street Cemetery.

References

1869 births
1953 deaths
People from Eketāhuna
New Zealand rugby union players
New Zealand international rugby union players
Wairarapa rugby union players
Rugby union forwards
New Zealand referees and umpires
Burials at Archer Street Cemetery
New Zealand rugby union referees